Fernando is a Spanish and Portuguese given name.

Fernando may also refer to:

Music
 Fernando (Handel opera), alternative title for the opera Sosarme
 Fernando (Schubert opera), Singspiel in one act, composed by Franz Schubert in 1815
 Fernando, opera by Carlo Arrigoni 1733
 "Fernando" (song), a song by ABBA in 1976

Sports
 Fernando Gómez (footballer, born 1965), Spanish football manager and former attacking midfielder
 Fernando Santos (footballer, born 1980), Brazilian football centre-back
 Fernando (footballer, born 1967), Fernando Henrique Mariano, Brazilian football midfielder
 Fernando (footballer, born 1974), Fernando Marcelo Campagnolo, Brazilian football defender
 Fernando (footballer, born 1978), Fernando Almeida de Oliveira, Brazilian football midfielder
 Fernando (footballer, born 1981), Fernando Domingos de Moura, Brazilian football forward
 Fernando (footballer, born 1984), Fernando de Jesus Ribeiro, Brazilian football goalkeeper
 Fernando (footballer, born May 1986), Fernando Gomes de Jesus, Brazilian football defensive midfielder
 Fernando (footballer, born July 1986), Fernando Ribeiro Fernandes, Brazilian football attacking midfielder
 Fernando (footballer, born November 1986), Fernando Augusto Azevedo Pedreira, Hong Kong football winger for Kitchee
 Fernando (footballer, born 1987), Fernando Francisco Reges, Brazilian football defensive midfielder for Sevilla
 Fernando (footballer, born 1992), Fernando Lucas Martins, Brazilian football defensive midfielder for Antalyaspor
 Fernando Neto (born 1993), Brazilian football midfielder for Operário	
 Fernando (footballer, born March 1999), Fernando dos Santos Pedro, Brazilian football forward for Red Bull Salzburg
 Fernando (footballer, born September 1999), Fernando Augusto Pereira Bueno Júnior, Brazilia left-back for Athletico Paranaense
 CD San Fernando, a Spanish football team
 Club San Fernando, an Argentine multi-sports club in San Fernando, Buenos Aires

Other
 Fernando (Barcelona Metro), a former Barcelona metro station
 Fernando Andacht, a Uruguayan-born semiotician
 Fernando de Noronha, a Brazilian island in the Atlantic
 Fernando, Minnesota
 Cirque Fernando, a former Parisian circus
 E. Fernando, an Indian politician
 Fernet con coca, an Argentinian cocktail also known as a fernando
 Estación San Fernando, a railway station in San Fernando, Chile
 "Fernando's Hideaway", a recurring Saturday Night Live sketch with Billy Crystal satirizing Fernando Lamas

See also
 Ferdinand
 Ferdinando (disambiguation)
 Fernand (disambiguation)
 Hernando (disambiguation)